Hôtel de Ville – Louis Pradel is a transfer station in the Lyon Metro, providing a connection between Line A and Line C.  The station is located in the Presqu'île district in Lyon, France.  Serving Lyon's 1st arrondissement, the station is near Lyon City Hall with access to Place des Terreaux, Opéra Nouvel, Museum of Fine Arts of Lyon, and other nearby attractions.  The station is a major interchange and is Line C's southern terminus providing its only connection with the rest of the metro system.

History
Hôtel de Ville – Louis Pradel station opened on May 2, 1978.  The opening of the station coincided with the opening of Line A and the extension of Line C which had previously been operating since 1974.

Station Layout
The upper level of Hôtel de Ville – Louis Pradel station consists of side platforms for Line A.  The lower level consists of Line C's terminus utilizing a Spanish solution track layout.  The central platform for Line C contains a number of pillars immediately adjacent to the railway tracks that may block the doors for exiting trains.

References

Railway stations in France opened in 1978
Lyon Metro stations